Sever may refer to:

Places in Portugal
 Sever, Santa Marta de Penaguião, a civil parish in the municipality of Santa Marta de Penaguião
 Sever, Moimenta da Beira, a civil parish in Moimenta da Beira Municipality
 Sever do Vouga Municipality, a municipality in the district of Aveiro
 Sever River, a tributary of the Tagus River

People
 Sever Dron (born 1944), Romanian tennis player
 Sever Mureșan (born 1948), Romanian tennis player
 Sever Voinescu (born 1969), Romanian politician
 Henry Sever (died 1471), English divine
 Ioan Axente Sever (1821–1906), Romanian revolutionary
 J. W. Sever, the physician who characterized Sever's disease in 1912
 Savin Sever (1927–2003), Slovene architect
 Stane Sever (1914–1970), Slovenian actor
 Sever, stage name of Canadian singer Skye Sweetnam
 Agent Sever, a fictional character in the film Ballistic: Ecks vs. Sever

Other uses
 Sever Murmansk, a Russian football club
 Sever Pipeline, an oil product pipeline in Russia
 "Sever", a song by Karate from the album Unsolved
 "Sever", a song by Porcupine Tree from the album Signify

See also
 Severed (disambiguation)
 Severn (disambiguation)
 Severus (disambiguation)

Romanian masculine given names